Mary Barlow may refer to:
 Mary Kate Barlow (1865–1934), Australian Catholic lay leader, philanthropist, editor, and women's advocate
 Mary Anne Barlow (born 1973), South African actress and voice artist